Noored Kooli (Estonian for Young people to schools) is a solution to address the critical teacher shortage in Estonia, drawing inspiration from a similar scheme, Teach First, in the United Kingdom. Launched on February 6, 2006, Noored Kooli aims to place 10-15 exceptional Estonian graduates into the schools that need them the most for a minimum of 2 years.

After this period participants can choose to remain in teaching or move on into other careers where the skills and experience gained from the programme will enable them to become leaders in any field

Noored Kooli participants receive an intensive teacher training course before entering schools to teach full-time on regular teachers' salaries with an added stipend provided by Noored Kooli.

During their time in schools, participants receive mentoring and support from leaders in education to ensure that they become exceptional and effective teachers.

Beyond the impact in the classroom, Noored Kooli participants take part in training and mentorships from both opinion and business leaders in Estonia.

Noored Kooli enjoys a wide breadth of support from both the public and private sectors.

See also 
 Tiigrihüpe

Sources
 Official website 

Education in Estonia
2006 establishments in Estonia